Social murder is the unnatural death that occurs due to social, political, or economic oppression. The phrase was coined by Friedrich Engels in his 1845 work The Condition of the Working-Class in England whereby "the class which at present holds social and political control" (i.e. the bourgeoisie) "places hundreds of proletarians in such a position that they inevitably meet a too early and an unnatural death". This was in a different category to murder and manslaughter committed by individuals against one another, as social murder explicitly was committed by the political and social elite against the poorest in society.

When one individual inflicts bodily injury upon another such that death results, we call the deed manslaughter; when the assailant knew in advance that the injury would be fatal, we call his deed murder. But when society places hundreds of proletarians in such a position that they inevitably meet a too early and an unnatural death, one which is quite as much a death by violence as that by the sword or bullet; when it deprives thousands of the necessaries of life, places them under conditions in which they cannot live – forces them, through the strong arm of the law, to remain in such conditions until that death ensues which is the inevitable consequence – knows that these thousands of victims must perish, and yet permits these conditions to remain, its deed is murder just as surely as the deed of the single individual; disguised, malicious murder, murder against which none can defend himself, which does not seem what it is, because no man sees the murderer, because the death of the victim seems a natural one, since the offence is more one of omission than of commission. But murder it remains.

Although originally written with regard to the English city of Manchester in the Victorian era, the term has been used by left-wing politicians such as John McDonnell in the 21st century to describe Conservative economic policy as well as events such as the Grenfell Tower fire. York University professor Dennis Raphael used it to describe Conservative public policy in Ontario, Canada. In 2007, Canadian economists Robert Chernomas and Ian Hudson of the University of Manitoba used the term to refer to conservative economics in their book Social Murder: And Other Shortcomings of Conservative Economics. In a 2018 article published in Critical Social Policy, sociologist Chris Grover of Lancaster University writes that social security austerity in Great Britain, which imposes hardships on the mental and physical well being of working class people, has resulted in "social murder" with increases in suicides, deaths from malnutrition and people dying on the streets. In 2021, the BMJ executive editor Kamran Abbasi used the term to describe governmental policy which had failed to control the COVID-19 pandemic.

Author and journalist Chris Hedges writes that the global ruling classes are the "architects of social murder" by accelerating ecological collapse and climate change:

What is taking place is not neglect. It is not ineptitude. It is not policy failure. It is murder. It is murder because it is premeditated. It is murder because a conscious choice was made by the global ruling classes to extinguish life rather than protect it. It is murder because profit, despite the hard statistics, the growing climate disruptions and the scientific modeling, is deemed more important than human life and human survival.

See also 
 Diseases of despair
 Shit life syndrome

References 

1840s neologisms
History of Manchester
Murder
Political terminology
Socialism
Sociological terminology
Victorian era